Brady Lake is a natural lake in Portage County, Ohio, United States. It is a kettle lake and has no natural tributaries or outlets. From 1927 to 2017, the areas along the eastern and southern shores were part of the village of Brady Lake.

Name
Brady Lake gets its name from Captain Samuel Brady who hid in the lake in 1780 while fleeing a band of local American Indians.   Initially, the lake was referred to as "Brady's Lake" before eventually being shortened to the modern Brady Lake.

Historical uses
Brady Lake was used during the operation of the Pennsylvania and Ohio Canal as a source of water along with nearby Pippen Lake, as the canal passed just to the south of the lake just east of present-day Kent, Ohio. From 1900-1924 Brady Lake was used to harvest ice in for local ice boxes, with some ice being shipped as far as Cleveland and Youngstown, Ohio.

References

Brady
Bodies of water of Portage County, Ohio
Ice trade
Kettle lakes in the United States